In axiomatic set theory, a function f : Ord → Ord is called normal (or a normal function) if and only if it is continuous (with respect to the order topology) and strictly monotonically increasing. This is equivalent to the following two conditions:

 For every limit ordinal γ (i.e. γ is neither zero nor a successor), it is the case that f(γ) = sup {f(ν) : ν < γ}.
 For all ordinals α < β, it is the case that f(α) < f(β).

Examples 
But  is not normal because it is not continuous at any limit ordinal; that is, the inverse image of the one-point open set  is the set , which is not open when λ is a limit ordinal.

More important examples of normal functions are given by the aleph numbers , which connect ordinal and cardinal numbers, and by the beth numbers .

Properties 
If f is normal, then for any ordinal α, 
f(α) ≥ α.
Proof: If not, choose γ minimal such that f(γ) < γ. Since f is strictly monotonically increasing, f(f(γ)) < f(γ), contradicting minimality of γ.

Furthermore, for any non-empty set S of ordinals, we have 
f(sup S) = sup f(S). 
Proof: "≥" follows from the monotonicity of f and the definition of the supremum. For "≤", set δ = sup S and consider three cases: 
 if δ = 0, then S = {0} and sup f(S) = f(0); 
 if δ = ν + 1 is a successor, then there exists s in S with ν < s, so that δ ≤ s. Therefore, f(δ) ≤ f(s), which implies f(δ) ≤ sup f(S); 
 if δ is a nonzero limit, pick any ν < δ, and an s in S such that ν < s (possible since δ = sup S). Therefore, f(ν) < f(s) so that f(ν) < sup f(S), yielding f(δ) = sup {f(ν) : ν < δ}  ≤ sup f(S), as desired.

Every normal function f has arbitrarily large fixed points; see the fixed-point lemma for normal functions for a proof.  One can create a normal function f'  : Ord → Ord, called the derivative of f, such that f' (α) is the α-th fixed point of f. For a hierarchy of normal functions, see Veblen functions.

Notes

References 

.

Set theory
Ordinal numbers